Jo Ann Pottorff (March 7, 1936) is a former member of the Kansas House of Representatives, representing the 83rd district. She served from 1985 to 2013.  Prior to her election she served as President of the Kansas Association of School Boards, as well as the Wichita School Board.

Pottorff was born in Wichita and has a BA in Elementary Education from Kansas State University and an MA in Urban Education from St. Louis University. She is a member of the Business Education Success Team, East Wichita Rotary, Forum for Executive Women, Wichita Chamber of Commerce, Junior League of Wichita, and National Assessment Governing Board.

Pottorff is a member of the Commerce and Labor, General Government Budget, Transportation and Public Safety Budget, and State Building Construction committees. One of the top donors to Pottorff's 2008 campaign was Kansans for Lifesaving Cures.

In May 2012, Pottorff announced that she would be retiring from politics and would not seek re-election.

References

External links
 Kansas Legislature - Jo Ann Pottorff
 Project Vote Smart profile
 Kansas Votes profile
 State Surge - Legislative and voting track record
 Campaign contributions: 1996,2000, 2002, 2004, 2006, 2008

Republican Party members of the Kansas House of Representatives
Living people
Women state legislators in Kansas
Kansas State University alumni
Saint Louis University alumni
1936 births
20th-century American women politicians
20th-century American politicians
21st-century American women politicians
21st-century American politicians